The Imagine Project is the forty-sixth and latest studio album by American jazz pianist Herbie Hancock released on June 22, 2010. Prominent guests include John Legend, India Arie, Seal, Dave Matthews, Jeff Beck, Chaka Khan,  Tedeschi & Trucks, The Chieftains and Los Lobos.

Background
The album, which was recorded in many locations throughout the world and features collaborations with various artists, was complemented by a documentary about the recording process. Hancock's interpretations of these songs are cross-cultural.  His version of "Imagine" was inspired by the Congolese group Konono N°1, and won the 2011 Grammy Award for "Best Pop Collaboration with Vocals" (the final year that that award was given).  The instruments used on "The Times, They Are A' Changin" combine the West African kora with the Celtic flute, fiddle and Uilleann pipes. It was released in CD, digital download and vinyl.

Reception
George Varga of JazzTimes noted "This hit-or-miss quality is present throughout the album, which-despite its diverse lineup and lofty ambitions-too often errs on the side of caution and politeness, when risk-taking and surprise would have made this a recording truly worthy of Hancock's expansive skills and imagination". John Eyles of BBC wrote "Ironically, in 2005 Hancock was elected to the Jazz Hall of Fame, since when the jazz aspects of his music have waned. Although The Imagine Project is entertaining and engaging, its jazz content is limited. Fans will hope that the 70-year-old still has another great jazz album in him – preferably alongside Shorter".

Track listing

Personnel
Credits adapted from AllMusic

Herbie Hancock – arrangement, keyboards, piano, prepared piano, production, background vocals

Alex Acuña – percussion
John Alagia – production
Ibrahim Ag Alhabib – background vocals
Abdallah Ag Alhousseyni – acoustic guitar, background vocals
Saïd Ag Ayad – djembe, background vocals
Lawrence Azerrad – design
Danny Barnes – banjo, bass, guitar
Jeff Beck – guitar
Chris Bolster – assistant engineering
Richard Bravo – percussion
Kofi Burbridge – Hammond B3, vocals
Oteil Burbridge – bass, vocals
Rodrigo Campos – percussion
Denis Caribaux – engineering
Céu – vocals
Matt Chamberlain – drums
Michael Chaves – guitar
The Chieftains – featured artist
K.S. Chithra – vocals
Vinnie Colaiuta – drums, tambourine
Kevin Conneff – bodhran
Rodrigo "Funai" Costa – assistant engineering
Curumin – drums
Paulinho Da Costa – percussion
Toumani Diabaté – kora
Yaya Diarra – engineering
Fatoumata Diawara – vocals
Larry Goldings – Hammond B3
Bernie Grundman – mastering
Roland Guillotel – engineering
Helik Hadar – engineering, mixing
Elaga Ag Hamid – guitar, background vocals
Jessica Hancock – production coordination, background vocals
Lisa Hannigan – vocals
Ken Hertz – arrangement, production
David Hidalgo – vocals
The Hill-Tones – background vocals
Graham Hope – assistant engineering
Shantau Hudikar – engineering
India.Arie – vocals
Anand Iyer – second engineer
Juanes – arrangement, vocals, production
Manu Katché – drums
Bhawai Shankar Kathak – pakhawaj drum
Seán Keane – fiddle
Alan Kelly – assistant engineering
Chaka Khan – vocals
Abhishek Khandelwal – assistant engineering, Pro-Tools
Douglas Kirkland – photography
Andrew Kitchen – assistant engineering
Larry Klein – bass, keyboards, background vocals
K'naan – vocals
Konono Nº1 – featured artist
Rhani Krija – percussion
Abdallah Ag Lamida "Intidao" – guitar, background vocals
Eyadou Ag Leche – bass guitar, background vocals
John Legend – vocals
Hugo Legrand – assistant engineering
Gustavo Lenza – engineering
Frank Lillis – lyric translation
Lionel Loueke – guitar
Los Lobos – featured artist
Jim Lowe – engineering
Conrad Lozano – vocals
Lucas Martins – electric bass
Dave Matthews – guitar, vocals
Mike Mattison – vocal arrangement, vocals
Ndofusu Mbiyavanga – percussion
Wagner Bigu Meirinho – assistant engineering
Cesar Mejia – engineering
Dani Michelle – wardrobe
Marcus Miller – arrangement, bass, production
Bill Mims – assistant engineering
Mawangu Mingiedi – likembe
Alan Mintz – executive production, background vocals
Matt Molloy – flute
Paddy Moloney – tin whistle, Uilleann pipes
Mandy Montiero – groomer
James Morrison – vocals
Melinda Murphy – executive production, production coordination
Áine Ní Ghlinn – lyric translation
Chris Owens – assistant engineering, Pro-Tools
Dean Parks – guitar
Sridhar Parthasarthy – mridangam
Louie Pérez – vocals
Cindi Peters – production coordination
P!nk – vocals
Maria Ruvalcaba – background vocals
Jaideep Sahni – translation
Oumou Sangare – vocals
Brian Scheuble – engineering
Eric Schilling – engineering
Seal – vocals
Anoushka Shankar – sitar
Wayne Shorter – saxophone (soprano)
Jaime Sickora – assistant engineering
Patrick Spain – assistant engineering
Satyajit Talwalkar – tabla
Ibrahim Tangara – engineering
Susan Tedeschi – vocals
Tinariwen – featured artist
Bobby Tis – engineering
Fernando Tobon – guitar
Alhassane Ag Touhami  – arrangement, guitar, vocals
Derek Trucks – arrangement, guitar, production
Visi Vincent – drums
Marty Wall – engineer
Pete Wallace – keyboards
George Whitty – keyboards, sound design
Tal Wilkenfeld – bass
Bill Winn – engineering
Richard Woodcraft – engineering

Charts

Certifications

References

2010 albums
Herbie Hancock albums